Crepidium marsupichilum, commonly known as the pouched spur orchid, is a plant in the orchid family and is endemic to tropical far north Queensland. It is an evergreen, terrestrial orchid with an cone-shaped stem, light green, shiny leaves and a large number of purple flowers crowded along a green and purple flowering stem.

Description
Flowering occurs between January and April.

Taxonomy and naming
The pouched spur orchid was first formally described in 1976 by Walter Thomas Upton who gave it the name Malaxis marsupichilum from a specimen collected in the McIlwraith Range. The description was published in The Orchadian. In 1995 Dariusz Szlachetko changed the name to Crepidium marsupichilum.

Distribution and habitat
Crepidium marsupichilum is widespread and common in tropical north Queensland including in the Iron Range and McIlwraith Range and on Torres Strait Islands where it grows in leaf litter in shady rainforest.

References 

marsupichilum
Orchids of Queensland
Plants described in 1976